Enrique Ruiz Escudero (born 24 December 1967) is a Spanish politician from the People's Party of the Community of Madrid (PP), serving as Cabinet Minister of Health of the Community of Madrid since September 2017 and as acting Cabinet Minister of Social Policy, Family, Equality and Natality from March 2021.

References

1967 births
Living people
People's Party (Spain) politicians
People from Madrid
Members of the 8th Assembly of Madrid
Members of the 9th Assembly of Madrid
Members of the 10th Assembly of Madrid
Members of the 11th Assembly of Madrid